Hot stamping or foil stamping is a printing method of relief printing in which pre-dried ink or foils are transferred to a surface at high temperatures. The method has diversified since its rise to prominence in the 19th century to include a variety of processes. After the 1970s, hot stamping became one of the most important methods of decoration on the surface of plastic products.

Process
In a hot stamping machine, a die is mounted and heated, with the product to be stamped placed beneath it. A metallized or painted roll-leaf carrier is inserted between the two, and the die presses down through it. The dry paint or foil used is impressed into the surface of the product. The dye-stamping process itself is non-polluting because the materials involved are dry. Pressure and heat cause the relevant sections of the foil to become detached from the carrier material and become bonded with the printing surface.

Tools
Along with foil stamping machines, among the commonly used tools in hot stamping are dies and foil. Dies may be made of metal or silicone rubber, and they may be shaped directly or cast. They can carry high levels of detail to be transferred to the surface and may be shaped to accommodate irregularities in the surface.

Foils are multilayered coatings that transfer to the surface of the product. Non-metallic foils consist of an adherence base, a color layer, and a release layer. Metallic foils replace the color layer with a layer of chrome or vacuum-metallized aluminum. Metallic foil construction has a metal-like sheen and is available in different metal shades such as gold, silver, bronze, and copper. Pigment foil does not have a metallic sheen but may be glossy or matte. Holographic foil paper includes a 3-dimensional image to provide a distinctive appearance to specific areas of a digitally printed application. Printing is often done on leather or paper.

Different hot stamping machines serve different purposes, but the most common hot stamping machines are simple up-and-down presses. Three of the most common brands are Kwikprint, Kingsley, and Howard. However, for more industrial applications Kluge and Heidelberg presses are more commonly used.

History
In the 19th century, hot stamping became a popular method of applying gold tooling or embossing in book printing on leather and paper. The first patent for hot stamping was recorded in Germany by Ernst Oeser in 1892. 

From the 1950s onward, the method became a popular means of marking plastic . Hot Stamping technology for plastic is used for electric components (TV frames, audio components, refrigerators etc), cosmetic containers (lipstick, cream, mascara, shampoo bottle etc), automobile parts (interior and exterior materials). 

As of 1998, it was one of the most commonly used methods of security printing.

Foil stamping can be used to make Radio-frequency identification (RFID) tags, although screen printing is faster and cheaper.

See also
Cold foil printing
Pad printing

References

Printing terminology